The Oklahoma International Bluegrass Festival is held annually in Guthrie, Oklahoma. The festival was founded as a nonprofit organization by Guthrie resident Byron Berline and Oklahoma state representative Joe Hutchinson in 1996. Each year the festival supports music education through music scholarships and other educational opportunities. The three-day festival draws over 15,000 participants.

References

External links
Official web site
Don Shorock's O.I.B.F. Photo Album - covers each year of the festival beginning in 1997
 Encyclopedia of Oklahoma History and Culture - International Bluegrass Festival

Bluegrass festivals
Music festivals in Oklahoma
Folk festivals in the United States
Tourist attractions in Logan County, Oklahoma
Music festivals established in 1996
Guthrie, Oklahoma